William Dudley Ripper (10 December 1912 – 7 August 1992) was an Australian rules footballer who played with Richmond and Hawthorn in the Victorian Football League (VFL).

Ripper later served in the Australian Army during World War II.

Notes

External links 

1912 births
1992 deaths
Australian rules footballers from Victoria (Australia)
Richmond Football Club players
Hawthorn Football Club players
South Bendigo Football Club players